Only the Strongest Will Survive is the second studio album by British rock band Hurricane #1. It was released on 21 April 1999. All songs were written by Andy Bell except "What Do I Know?" by Alex Lowe. It made number 55 in the UK album charts, and the top 20 in Japan.

The band attempted a different musical approach with this album, with a heavier influence of electronic sounds, drum machines and sampling. Remixers were approached to provide the many remixes of songs from this album.

Track listing

All songs written by Andy Bell (Creation Songs), except "What Do I Know?", written by Alex Lowe (Creation Songs).
 "Intro" - 1:54
 "N.Y.C." - 4:06
 "The Greatest High" - 3:58
 "Remote Control" - 4:47
 "The Price That We Pay" - 3:16
 "Separation Sunday" - 5:33
 "Rising Sign" - 7:02
 "Only the Strongest Will Survive" - 4:43
 "Long Way Down" - 6:39
 "Twilight World" - 3:59
 "Come Alive" - 4:05
 "What Do I Know?" - 3:58
 "Afterhours" - 6:00
 "Outro/N.Y.C.2" - 14:45
 "Sweet Insanity" - 4:17 (Japanese bonus track)
 "You Wear It Well" - 4:13 (Japanese bonus track)

Note: 
 In the CD version, the track 14 was finished at 3:14, continue with silence, and latter with the hidden track (sometimes considered as the reprise of the "Intro"), which begins at 6:16.
 In the digital version, the silence and the hidden track on track 14 were not included. However, some of the digital version was included the hidden track as separate track.
 Japanese CD version includes 2 bonus tracks, with the silence and the hidden track on track 14 were omitted for this version due to limitation capacity of CD.

Personnel
Alex Lowe - lead vocals 
Andy Bell - guitars, keyboards, backing vocals
Will Pepper - bass
Gareth Farmer - drums
Steve Sidelnyck - programming, percussion
Ian "Mac" McLagan - Hammond organ, Wurlitzer, piano, clarinet
Idha - backing vocals on "Afterhours"

Singles

References
 Citations

Sources

External links

Only the Strongest Will Survive at YouTube (streamed copy where licensed)

1999 albums
Hurricane No. 1 albums
Creation Records albums
Epic Records albums